Suddenly Last Summer is a play written by Tennessee Williams which premiered in 1958.

It may also refer to:

 Suddenly, Last Summer (film), a 1959 film by Joseph L. Mankiewicz based on the play
 "Suddenly Last Summer" (song), a 1983 song by The Motels
 "Suddenly, Last Summer" (Modern Family), a 2013 episode of the American sitcom Modern Family
 Suddenly Last Summer, a 2009 album by Jimmy Somerville